Charles Fleury is a Canadian trade union activist who is currently the National Secretary-Treasurer of the Canadian Union of Public Employees (CUPE). Fleury was first elected to his current position of National Secretary-Treasurer on November 2, 2011 at the CUPE National Convention in Vancouver, British Columbia.

Career
Fleury started his activism as a trade unionist in 1982, when he started working for Hydro-Québec, working as a millwright and high-tension tower lineman under CUPE local 1500.  By 1999, he was elected to the position of secretary general of local 1500  Fleury was first elected to the CUPE National Executive board as a regional vice-president for the Québec division  On November 2, 2011, Fleury was elected to his first term as CUPE National Secretary-Treasurer.  He was re-elected as National Secretary-Treasurer again in 2013 and 2015.

Fleury is also known for being a strong advocate for climate change having attended major global summits including the 2009 United Nations Climate Change Conference in Copenhagen and the 2015 United Nations Climate Change Conference in Paris. 

As with many trade union activists in Canada, Fleury is a supporter of the New Democratic Party of Canada and works closely with many NDP officials and candidates across Canada.

References

Year of birth missing (living people)
Living people